Restricted Data (RD) is a category of proscribed information, per National Industrial Security Program Operating Manual (NISPOM). Specifically, it is defined by the Atomic Energy Act of 1954 as:
all data concerning (1) design, manufacture, or utilization of atomic weapons; (2) the production of special nuclear material; or (3) the use of special nuclear material in the production of energy, but shall not include data declassified or removed from the Restricted Data category pursuant to section 142 [of the Act].
The concept was initially introduced, with similar wording, in the Atomic Energy Act of 1946. It was added at a relatively late moment to the bill by its creators, after the Gouzenko affair was leaked to the press and caused a fear of loss of "the secret" of the atomic bomb, as well as fears that the Espionage Act of 1917 was not sufficiently adequate.

The Atomic Energy Act of 1946 further specified that anyone who:

communicates, transmits, or discloses... any document, writing, sketch, photograph, plan, model, instrument, appliance, note, or information involving or incorporating restricted data... to any individual or person, or attempts or conspires to any of the foregoing, with intent to injure the United States or with intent to secure an advantage to any foreign nation, upon conviction thereof, shall be punished by death or imprisonment for life... or, by a fine of not more than $20,000 or imprisonment for not more than twenty years, or both...

The Act empowered and required the then-newly-created Atomic Energy Commission to regulate Restricted Data both internally and externally.

The fact that its legal definition includes "all data" except that already specifically declassified has been interpreted to mean that atomic energy information in the United States is born classified, even if it was not created by any agency of the U.S. government. The authority of the DOE to implement this authority as a form of prior restraint was only once tested in court, with inconclusive results.

"Restricted Data" should not be confused with the classification category of "Restricted", a relatively low category of classification.  "Restricted Data" is not a level of classification; rather, a document can be classified as Confidential, Secret, or Top Secret, while also containing "Restricted Data."  In addition, a document containing Restricted Data could also contain Critical Nuclear Weapon Design Information (CNWDI).  In this way, a document, for instance, could be classified as "Secret" (S), "Secret//Restricted Data" (S//RD), or "Secret//Restricted Data-Critical Nuclear Weapon Design Information" (S//RD-CNWDI) depending on the type of information a document contains.

Formerly Restricted Data (FRD) is a category also designated in the Atomic Energy Act of 1954. Despite its name, it does not mean that the information so designated is unclassified. It means that they have been downgraded specifically for the purpose of sharing among military agencies as "National Security Information". It is defined as "Classified information which has been removed from the Restricted Data category after DOE and the Department of Defense have jointly determined that it relates primarily to the military utilization of atomic weapons, and can be adequately safeguarded as national security information."

See also
Critical Nuclear Weapon Design Information

References

United States government secrecy
Nuclear secrecy